Hans Oliva-Hagen (14 April 1922 in Berlin, Nikolassee – 1992) was a journalist, writer, and screenwriter in the German Democratic Republic who wrote under the pseudonyms Hans Oliva and John Ryder. His most important works include his collaboration on the scripts for the DEFA film Carbide and Sorrel (1963) and the five-part GDR television film Conscience in Riot (1961). An anti-fascist militant and Holocaust survivor of Jewish heritage, Oliva-Hagen was active in the German resistance to Nazism.

Life
Hans Hagen was born in Berlin, the son of the German Jewish economist, banker, bank archivist, and anti-fascist activist Hermann Carl Hagen. His mother, Hedwig Elise Caroline Staadt, was a German Christian. He attended boarding school in Switzerland, which he had to leave after completing elementary school. His brother Karl-Heinz Hagen worked as editor-in-chief for a number of German publications.

In 1937, he travelled to Spain to volunteer with the International Brigades, which fought on the side of the Republican government of Spain against the fascists under General Franco, but was turned down because of his young age. He then moved to France, where he worked in Marseille, among other places. He was employed as a dock worker. From 1940 on he lived in Berlin and was active in the resistance against the Nazis. In 1941 he was arrested by the police during an illegal leaflet campaign and imprisoned in the Moabit prison, where he was subjected to Nazi human experimentation. He was captured and tortured while trying to escape from the Dahlem Manor, where he was employed as a prison harvest worker. In 1945 the Soviet Red Army stormed and liberated Moabit Prison.

Hans Hagen's father Hermann was murdered in the special campaign against Jews on 27 and 28 May 1942, an act of revenge by the Nazis after the assassination attempt on Reinhard Heydrich. Along with 500 other German Jews selected arbitrarily, Hagen was abducted from Berlin and taken to the Sachsenhausen concentration camp where he was murdered on 29 May 1942. His mother Hedwig was also murdered at Sachsenhausen.

Following the end of World War II, Hans Oliva-Hagen lived in East Berlin when it was administered by the Soviet Union, and joined the Socialist Unity Party of Germany. He was later expelled from the party due to criticism, initially working in radio and press administration. He worked as a freelance journalist and author from 1952.

On 4 May 1954, he married the actress Eva-Maria Hagen in Berlin. The marriage ended in divorce in 1959. Their daughter Catharina "Nina" Hagen, born on 11 March 1955, stayed with her mother after the divorce. Nina became a singer and actress. Nina's daughter Cosma Shiva Hagen also became an actress.

Filmography
 1955: Das Stacheltier – Episode 41: Das Haushaltswunder (Idea)
 1958: Im Sonderauftrag (Script with Heinz Thiel)
 1961: Gewissen in Aufruhr, TV novel in 5 parts (Script with Günter Reisch and Hans-Joachim Kasprzik)
 1962: Die letzte Chance (Script)
 1963: Carbide and Sorrel (Script with Frank Beyer)
 1963: Drei Kriege. 1. Tauroggen, DDR-Fernsehfilm (Script with Roland Gräf and Norbert Büchner)
 1963: Der andere neben dir (Script with Ulrich Thein and Hartwig Strobel)
 1964: Drei Kriege. 2. Hinter den Fronten, DDR-Fernsehfilm (Script with Roland Gräf und Norbert Büchner)
 1965: Drei Kriege. 3. In Berlin, DDR-Fernsehfilm (Script with Roland Gräf and Norbert Büchner)
 1966: Trick 17b, DDR-Fernsehfilm (Dramaturgy)
 1966: Asse (Script with Karl Gass)

Bibliography
 1953: Asphalt, Tempo, Silberpfeile (Narrative, with Erich Rackwitz), Berlin, Verlag Neues Leben
 1954: Auf die Plätze – fertig – los! (Narrative), Berlin, Verlag Neues Leben
 1957: Die Sowjetunion von A–Z (with Erich Rackwitz)
 1958: Bei unseren Soldaten. Aus dem Leben der Nationalen Volksarmee (with J. C. Schwarz), Berlin, Verlag des Ministeriums für Nationale Verteidigung

Awards
 1961 National Prize of the German Democratic Republic – 1st class for Art and Culture (part of a collective for the screenplay of Gewissen in Aufruhr)

References

External links
 

Hans Oliva-Hagen entry in the Catalog of the German National Library
 Current Camera: Commentary by Hans Oliva-Hagen on the film "Conscience in Rebellion", Deutscher Fernsehfunk. 7 February 1962. (Video in the ARD Retro service of the ARD Media Library)

1922 births
1992 deaths
East German journalists
German expatriates in Switzerland
German people of Jewish descent
German screenwriters
German male screenwriters
German torture victims
Hagen family
Holocaust survivors
Jewish socialists
People from Berlin
Recipients of the National Prize of East Germany
Socialist Unity Party of Germany members